Hidayat Inayat Khan (6 August 1917 – 12 September 2016) was a British-French classical composer, conductor and Representative-General of the Inayati Order.

Biography
Hidayat was born in London to Sufi Master Inayat Khan and Pirani Ameena Begum; brother of Noor Inayat Khan, Vilayat Inayat Khan and Khair-un-Nisa (Claire) Inayat Khan ; and father of Fazal Inayat-Khan, who led the Inayati Order from 1968-82. His western musical education began in Paris in 1932 at the Ecole Normale de Musique, in the violin class of Bernard Sinsheimer; the composition class of Nadia Boulanger; and the orchestra class of Diran Alexanian.  Later, he attended chamber music courses given by the Lener Quartet in Budapest.

In 1942, Hidayat Inayat-Khan became Professor of music at the Lycée Musical de Dieulefit, France, and later, in the Netherlands, joined the orchestra of Haarlem as violinist.  He followed the courses of orchestra conducting by Toon Verhey.  In 1952, Hidayat Inayat-Khan conducted the orchestra of 's-Hertogenbosch for the worldwide broadcasting of his Po'me en Fa for orchestra and piano and in the same year, founded his first chamber music orchestra ensemble. Performance highlights in Hidayat Inayat-Khan's professional life include the playing, on 4 May 1957, of his Zikar Symphony at Salle Pleyel, Paris, conducted by Georges Prêtre, in a Pasdeloup concert.  On the occasion of Mahatma Gandhi's centenary, on 21 November 1969, the Gandhi Symphony was played in a special concert organised by UNESCO in the Netherlands.  This was repeated in 1971 during a broadcasting of "The Voice of America", as well as on the United Nations Radio in the USA and was later recorded by the US Armed Forces Radio Stations in a worldwide Carmen Dragon show. On 15 October 1971, the Virginia Symphonic Poem was played in honour of the Bicentennial of America. On Bavarian Radio La Monotonia was played in a Composer's Portrait in 1972 and The Message Symphony was played in 1977.

On 15–16 February 2002, the Suite Symphonic and La Monotonia, Op. 7 for Orchestra were performed by the Symphonisches Orchester München-Andechs with Andreas Pascal Heinzmann conducting in Munich, Germany. On 5 May 2007, the Royal Legend Symphonic Poem (op. 46) will receive its world premiere in Munich. It will be performed by the Zorneding-Baldham Orchestra with Andreas Pascal Heinzmann conducting. He has composed numerous works, among them Concerto for strings Op 38, Quartet for Strings Op. 45, Poem in F, and a number of choral pieces including Chanson Exotique, Awake for Morning, and a collection of Sufi hymns. He is a founding member of the European Composers' Union, and his music has frequently been broadcast internationally. Besides his symphonic works Hidayat Inayat-Khan has written choral compositions, Sufi songs and hymns as well as chamber music. Many of his compositions are now available on CD. His research in music could be described as a cross-point between eastern monophony and western polyphony; respecting western harmonic structures while also expressing the inspiring flavour of eastern ragas. In 1988, he assumed the role of Representative-General of the Inayati Order and Pir-o-Murshid of its Inner School.

Music
Nous vous invitons à la Prière and other compositions and Sufi songs of Hidayat Inayat-Khan – smaller compositions for voice, instrument, quartet. Mirasound Classics 399277 Holland 1997 ASIN: B0002NBLQC
Symphonic Works. Hidayat Inayat-Khan. "Sound of Light", Banff, Canada 1999 Double CD, total time 108 min. ASIN: B000LE1A04
Message from the Heart. Hidayat Inayat-Khan – extracts from his symphonic works, Oreade Music 2000, Haarlem. ORS 59622. CD total time 52:16 ASIN: B00004U0Y3
Suite Symphonique Op. 7 by Hidayat Inayat-Khan – Live in Munich 2002. Symphonisches Orchester München-Andechs – Conductor Andreas Pascal Heinzmann (also in the concert: Symphonie Nr. 1 C.Moll von J. Brahms)
Monotonia. Mystery. Hidayat Inayat-Khan. CJ Music 2003. Novosibirsk (Russia) CD, total time 68:30
Ballet Rituel Op. 17 Hidayat Inayat-Khan – Live 19. Juli 2003 in München. Symphonisches Orchester München-Andechs – Conductor Andreas Pascal Heinzmann (also in the concert: Rhapsodie von Rachmaninov, Symphonie Nr. 2 D-Dur von J. Brahms)
 The Singing Zikar of Hazrat Inayat Khan composed by Inayat Khan, arranged by Hidayat Inayat Khan, performed and published by Jelaluddin Gary Sill (CD) (1987)

Books
 Sufi Teachings: Lectures from Lake O'Hara by Hidayat Inayat-Khan.  Publisher: Ekstasis Editions (15 August 1996), 120 pages, 
 The Inner School: Esoteric Sufi Teachings by Hidayat Inayat-Khan. Publisher: Ekstasis Editions (15 August 1997)  Google Books
 Reflections on the Art of Personality by Hidayat Inayat-Khan. 128 pages Publisher: Ekstasis Editions (25 December 2001)  Google Books
 Once Upon a Time. Early Days Stories About My Beloved Father and Mother by Hidayat Inayat-Khan. 2002
 Reflections on Philosophy, Psychology and Mysticism: Contemplations on Sufi Teachings by Hidayat Inayat-Khan. Ekstasis Editions (2003) 96 pages,  Google Books
 Reflections on Inner Sufi Teachings by Hidayat Inayat-Khan. Ekstasis Editions (2006) 120 pages,  Google Books
 Reflections on Spiritual Liberty by Hidayat Inayat-Khan. Ekstasis Editions (15 October 2007) 122 pages, 
 Spiritual Liberty by Hidayat Inayat-Khan. Readworthy Publications (1 April 2011) 180 pages 
 Sufi Message of Unity of Religious Ideals Readworthy Publications (3 April 2012) 102 pages

in German language:

 Eine Fackel in der Dunkelheit von Hidayat Inayat-Khan  Heilbronn Verlag (1997) 
 Geistige Freiheit von Hidayat Inayat-Khan. Petama Project Verlag, 185 pages, 
 Es war einmal ... von Hidayat Inayat-Khan. Heilbronn Verlag (1998) 88 pages, 

in Greek language:

 Η εσωτερική σχολή (i esoteriki scholi) by Hidayat Inayat Khan. Kyveli (2005) 
 Το βιβλίο της υγείας (To vivlio tis ygeias). Pyrinos Kosmos (1997) 
 I dimiourgiki fysi ton doniseon kai i dynami tou logou. Publisher: Pyrinos Kosmos (1994) 

in French language:

 Le Sentier du Souvenir: Enseignements sur le Zikar Chanté de Hazrat Inayat Khan. "Petama" 2009. 
 
in Russian language:

 Sufi Teachings: Pir-o-Murshid Hidayat Inayat-Khan ("Учение Суфиев Пир-о-Муршида Хадайят Инайят Хана") Publisher: Novosibirsk (2002), 148 pages.

Video
 Hidayat Inayat Khan's "La Monotonia", choreography by Peter Leung of the Het Nationale Ballet, and danced by Maria Sascha Khan, and Wieslaw Dudek (Staatsballett Berlin). 2007 
 Hidayat Inayat Khan – Interview for television program "Chai Time" (Vancouver)   
 Hidayat Inayat Khan Monotonia from Concerto for strings op 48. Novosibirsk. 13 September 2010. Novosibirsk String Quintet: Oganes Girunian, violin; Alexander Kasheev, violin; Ilya Tarasenko, viola; Stanislav Ovchinnikov, cello; Viktor Murashov, contrabass.

Audio books
The Wisdom of the Sufis: A Dialogue Between Hidayat Inayat-Khan and Deepak Chopra, (Dialogues at the Chopra Center for Well Being) (Audio Cassette) Hay House Audio Books (February 2000)

Notes

External links
 Website. Biography, scores and recordings.
 The Music of Hidayat Inayat-Khan (scores in PDF format)
 composers-classical-music.com

1917 births
2016 deaths
English violinists
English conductors (music)
British male conductors (music)
English composers
20th-century French male violinists
British male violinists
French conductors (music)
French male conductors (music)
French composers
French male composers
French music educators
English Sufis
French Sufis
Ināyati Sufis
Sufi music
Modern Sufi music
British emigrants to France
English people of Indian descent
English people of American descent
Musicians from London
People from Bloomsbury
People from Suresnes
École Normale de Musique de Paris alumni